Natanz (also romanized as Naţanz) is a city and capital of Natanz County, Isfahan Province, Iran. At the 2006 census, its population was 12,060, in 3,411 families.

Its bracing climate and locally produced fruit are well known in Iran. Its pear fruits are well known. The Karkas mountain chain (Kuh-e Karkas) (meaning mountain of vultures), at an elevation of 3,899 meters, rises above the town.

Various small shrines dot the area, and it is known as the shrine of Abd as-Samad. The elements in the present complex date from 1304 with subsequent additions and restorations, such as the Khaneqah and Muqarnas vault. The tomb honors the Sufi Sheikh Abd al-Samad, and was built by the Sheikh's disciple, the Ilkhanid vizier Zain al-Din Mastari.

Nuclear facility

Natanz nuclear facility is part of Iran’s nuclear program. It is located some 33 km NNW from the town near a major highway, is generally recognized as Iran's central facility for uranium enrichment with over 19,000 gas centrifuges currently operational and nearly half of them being fed with uranium hexafluoride.

Enrichment of uranium at the plant was halted in July 2004 during negotiations with European countries. In 2006, Iran announced that it would resume enrichment. In September 2007, the Iranian government announced that they had installed 3,000 centrifuges at Natanz. In 2010, the International Atomic Energy Agency (IAEA) was told by the Iranian government that future enrichment programmes would take place at Natanz, and they would start in March 2011.

In January 2013, Fereydoun Abbasi from the Atomic Energy Organization of Iran said: "five percent uranium enrichment is continuing at Natanz, and we will continue 20 percent enrichment at Fordo and Natanz to meet our needs".

Daily inspection by the IAEA of the Natanz site was agreed as part of the nuclear enrichment reduction agreement made with the P5+1 countries in November 2013.

On 28 October 2020, the International Atomic Energy Agency (IAEA) released satellite images acknowledging that Iran had begun the construction of an underground plant near its nuclear facility at Natanz. In March 2021, Iran restarted enriching uranium at the Natanz facility with a third set of advanced nuclear centrifuges in a series of violations of the 2015 nuclear accord.

Security incidents
Between 2007–2010 Natanz nuclear power plant was hit by a sophisticated cyber attack that has been alleged to have been carried out in an operation called Olympic Games by a coalition of German, French, British, American, Dutch and Israeli intelligence organizations. The attack used a Stuxnet worm which hampered the operation of plant's centrifuges and caused damage to them over time. The alleged goal of the cyber attack was not to destroy the nuclear program of Iran completely but to stall it enough for sanctions and diplomacy to take effect. This alleged goal was achieved, as the Joint Comprehensive Plan of Action nuclear treaty with Iran was reached in July 2015.

Around 2 a.m. local time on 2 July 2020, a fire and explosion hit a centrifuge production plant at a nuclear enrichment facility in Natanz. A group known as the "Cheetahs of the Homeland" claimed responsibility for the attack. Some Iranian officials suggested that the incident may have been caused by cyber sabotage.

On 10 April 2021, Iran began injecting uranium hexaflouride gas into advanced IR-6 and IR- 5 centrifuges at Natanz, but on the next day, an accident occurred in the electricity distribution network. On 11 April, IRNA reported that the incident was due to a power failure and that there were no injuries nor any escape of radioactive material. Further details eventually emerged that it was actually Israel that orchestrated the attack. On 17 April, Iranian state television named 43-year-old Reza Karimi from Kashan as a suspect for the blackout, stating that he had fled the country before the sabotage happened.

geographical location 
Natanz is located 120 km northeast of Isfahan and on the main north-south highway of Iran. Its height is 1666 meters above sea level. The distance between Tehran and Natanz is 326 km and it takes about 4 hours by car.

Geographic coordinates in decimal degrees (WGS84) Latitude: 33.530

Longitude: 51.904 Geographic coordinates in degrees minutes seconds (WGS84) Latitude: 33 31 '47'' Longitude: 51 54' 14'' . The average temperature of the city is 27 degrees Celsius and the average rainfall in different seasons of the year is 19 mm.

Natanz products

Saffron 
Natanz saffron is one of the agricultural products of Natanz city, which is compatible with the climate of this region. Natanz saffron is of good quality and most of this product is exported. Because Natanz city has three different types of climate, saffron cultivation in this area has given good results, so that some years it has yielded more than 1600 kg of dry saffron. Currently, the economy of Natanz is in the field of agriculture, people make a living by producing garden products such as pears, beets, walnuts, pomegranates and saffron.

Gallery

See also 

 Fordow Fuel Enrichment Plant
 Nuclear facilities in Iran
 Stuxnet computer worm

References

External links 

 Institute for Science and International Security
 Stanford University entry on Natanz
 www.globalsecurity.org Entry on Natanz
 The Sheikh Abdolsamad Mosque in Natanz Iran
 Natanz County
 Natanz News

Populated places in Natanz County
Cities in Isfahan Province
Nuclear program of Iran